Cham-e Zir (also Romanized as Cham-e Zīr; also known as Cham-e Rīz and Chamrīz) is a village in Kamfiruz-e Shomali Rural District, Kamfiruz District, Marvdasht County, Fars Province, Iran. At the 2006 census, its population was 389, in 79 families.

References 

Populated places in Marvdasht County